Clare Abbott may refer to:

 Clare Abbott (artist) (born 1921), South African wildlife artist and illustrator
 Clare Abbott (equestrian) (born 1986), Irish eventing rider